The 9th Platino Awards ceremony, organised by EGEDA and FIPCA, was held on 1 May 2022 at the IFEMA Palacio Municipal in Madrid, Spain. The ceremony was hosted by Lali Espósito and Miguel Ángel Muñoz.

Background 
In February 2022, Madrid was disclosed to be the venue of the awards, returning to the Spanish capital after the 8th edition celebrated in October 2021. Soon after, the organizing committee published the 206 pre-selections, to be cut to a shortlist of 20 candidates per category and then to the final 4 nominations for each of the 22 categories of the awards. Regarding the film area, Spain scooped 9% of pre-selections, followed by Argentina, Mexico, Peru, Portugal and Uruguay (all grossing a 6%). In regard of the television area, Mexico dominated with a 16% of pre-selections, followed by Spain (14%) and Argentina and Chile (both 10%). The shortlist was announced on 1 March 2022.

The nominations were announced on 31 March 2022 via YouTube from the Madrid Town Hall by Daniel Guzmán, Darío Yazbek, Edgar Vittorino, Luis Cobos, Rossy De Palma and Stephanie Cayo. Spanish film The Good Boss and Argentine TV series El reino led the nominations with eleven and six respectively. In April 2022, Carmen Maura was announced as the recipient of the honorary award, and Kany García, Lali, Nia, Pedro Fernández and Rozalén as musical performers during the gala.  In addition to the aforementioned acts, the gala also featured the unannounced performance of Ana Belén singing a version of "Sólo le pido a Dios".

Winners and nominees

The winners and nominees are listed as follows:

Film

Television

Platino Honorary Award
 Carmen Maura

Multiple nominations and awards

Film 
The following films received multiple nominations:

Television

References

External links
 

May 2022 events in Spain
2022 in Madrid
2021 film awards
2021 television awards